Groleau is a surname that may refer to:

People with the surname 
François Groleau (born 1973), ice hockey player from Quebec
Josaphat Groleau (1893–1993), Quebec businessman, mayor, county prefect, and president of the Sainte-Thècle Village School Board
Marcel Groleau, president of the Quebec trade union, Union des producteurs agricoles